McClellan–Palomar Airport (Palomar Airport)  is a public airport three miles (5 km) southeast of Carlsbad in San Diego County, California. It is owned by the County of San Diego. The airport is used for both general aviation and commercial aviation. As of March 2013, the airport was the fourth-busiest single runway airport in the United States.

Most U.S. airports use the same three-letter location identifier for the FAA and IATA, but McClellan–Palomar Airport is CRQ to the FAA and CLD to the IATA. The ICAO identifier is KCRQ.

The airport is named for Gerald McClellan, an aviator and civic leader in San Diego's North County area.

The airport was the basis of part of the name of the TV production company Lorimar Television.

Facilities
The airport also has one asphalt helipad that is 100 by 100 feet (30 x 30 m).

In 2017, the airport had 160,887 aircraft operations, an average of 441 per day: 95% general aviation, 4% air taxi, >1% scheduled commercial, and >1% military. 288 aircraft are based at this airport: 59% single-engine, 21% jet, 12% multi-engine, and 5% helicopter.

It opened a $24-million terminal on January 29, 2009.

As of October 26, 2010, Palomar Airport's long-term parking rates (30 day maximum) increased from $3 to $5 per day.

Airlines and destinations

In early 2020, Taos Air inaugurated seasonal skiing-oriented flights between McClellan–Palomar and Taos Regional Airport in New Mexico. Advanced Air announced new seasonal service to Mammoth Lakes on the Dornier 328JET and, occasionally, the King Air 350.

Surf Air is a private air charter company that offers flights between McClellan–Palomar, selected California cities, and Las Vegas. The company began its first flights in 2013 and expanded to San Diego by late 2014, operating from the Atlantic Aviation FBO. Clay Lacy Aviation also operates at McClellan–Palomar Airport, providing aircraft management services, charters using the company's fleet of business jets, and full-service aircraft maintenance.

Past airline service
The airport was previously served by United Express with flights operated by SkyWest Airlines. In May 2015, United Express ended service to the airport due to the phaseout of their Embraer EMB-120 Brasilia turboprop aircraft as SkyWest then transitioned to an all regional jet fleet with these aircraft requiring a runway longer than the airport's runway length.

Other airline service into the airport in the past included American Eagle operated by Wings West Airlines and United Express operated by WestAir Airlines with both commuter air carriers flying to Los Angeles (LAX) as well as America West Express (later US Airways Express) operating nonstop to Phoenix–Sky Harbor. In 1977, Scenic Airlines was flying Fairchild Swearingen Metroliner propjets nonstop to Palm Springs with direct one stop service to both Las Vegas and Phoenix. In 1995, American Eagle and United Express were operating a combined total of twelve nonstop services a day to LAX with both airlines flying British Aerospace BAe Jetstream 31 commuter propjets on the route. In 1999, Mesa Airlines was operating the America West Express nonstop service to Phoenix with three flights a day with de Havilland Canada DHC-8 Dash 8 turboprops.  Imperial Airlines also served McClellan-Palomar and was based at the airport during the 1980s. Air Resorts operated flights from the airport as well during the 1980s. Golden West Airlines also operated service during the 1970s from the airport with de Havilland Canada DHC-6 Twin Otter commuter aircraft. All of the airlines that previously served Carlsbad operated either turboprop or prop aircraft on their services into the airport.

BizAir Shuttle, a public charter airline with flights operated by Ultimate Air Shuttle utilizing Dornier 328JET aircraft, briefly operated scheduled service from McClellan–Palomar to LAX and McCarran International Airport in Las Vegas during the summer of 2015.

JetsuiteX announced charter flight services to Burbank and San Jose starting October 17, 2016. However; due to low customer demand, the scheduled services to and from Carlsbad airport were canceled.

On August 16, 2017, the airport announced new commercial jet service from Cal Jet by Elite Airways, which planned to operate daily commercial flights to Las Vegas starting September 28, 2017. County officials said Cal Jet planned on operating a Bombardier CRJ700 with 63 Seats, becoming the first commercial service at the airport since 2015. Cal Jet will operate out of the main commercial terminal, with the hope of adding other cities such as San Jose, Oakland, Sacramento, and Phoenix in the near future. As of August 2017, tickets were on sale, with fares starting at $69 one-way. Cal Jet abruptly ended service in April 2018.

The airport was the headquarters for California Pacific Airlines, which planned flights on four routes from the airport. On August 27, 2018 the airline announced service would begin on November 1, 2018, with service to San Jose, California, and Reno, Nevada, to be followed by service to Las Vegas, Nevada and Phoenix, Arizona beginning November 15, 2018. This service was reduced from an initial plan to serve six destinations including Sacramento, California; Oakland, California; and Cabo San Lucas, Mexico. California Pacific Airlines ceased operations as of January 16, 2019.In January 2020, owner Ted Vallas stated that California Pacific Airlines planned to resume service in the future, but ultimately the airline's operating certificate was revoked in October 2020. 
Owner Ted Vallas died in November of that year.

Accidents and incidents
On January 24, 2006, a Cessna Citation V landing on runway 24 on a flight from Friedman Memorial Airport in Hailey, Idaho, burst into flames after crashing into a self-storage facility adjacent to the airport. All four aboard (two passengers and two crew) were killed; no one on the ground was hurt.
 On July 3, 2007, a Beechcraft 90 King Air carrying two people crashed after taking off shortly after 6 a.m. in dense fog. The aircraft hit power lines, which caused power outages for local residents and businesses. The two on board died.
 On September 22, 2008, a Cessna 152 crashed just west of College Boulevard on the extended centerline after departing runway 24. The aircraft had two on board, who were both injured and evacuated by air.
 On September 28, 2008, a Beechcraft Bonanza crashed southeast of the airport after the pilot aborted a landing attempt in fog. The pilot was alone and was killed.
 On November 18, 2015, a Eurocopter AS350 Écureuil helicopter crashed at the airport, killing two people.
 On July 16, 2022, a Socata TB-21 on approach to the airport made a forced landing on a nearby street, striking a car and causing minor injuries to two in the car and two in the aircraft. The cause of the accident is under investigation.

References

External links

Airport website
Palomar–McClellan Airport renovations

Airports in San Diego County, California
Carlsbad, California